The City of Athens Cultural Center is the cultural center of the Municipality of Athens, in Greece. It is housed in an 1836 neoclassical building in the center of Athens. Originally the building housed the Municipal Hospital. It includes three exhibition rooms, the Fotis Kontoglou, Georgios Iakovidis and Nikolaos Gyzis halls, as well as the Antonis Tritsis amphitheatre, which holds various interdisciplinary seminars, conferences and other events.

External links
City of Athens
athens-greece.us

Culture in Athens
Art museums and galleries in Greece
Infrastructure completed in 1836
Buildings and structures in Athens
Municipality of Athens
Tourist attractions in Athens